Jane Wiswell Pegel is an American sailor, on water and on ice, who was elected into the United States' National Sailing Hall of Fame in 2021.

Sailing history 
Pegel grew up on Williams Bay in Wisconsin and graduated from Williams Bay High School in 1961. She learned ice boat racing in a Skeeter and in her first race in 1948, she recalled being first to the wind mark, but then not being able to finish because she did not know how to sail downwind. In 1957, she changed to the International DN ice boat in 1957. In 1960, she became the first woman to win the annual International DN championship and she won her first North American championship in the class; she won again in 1963. While Pegel sometimes skis, during a 1965 interview published in Sports Illustrated, she noted 

In the summer, Pegel races in the M-16 Scow class at the Lake Geneva Yacht Club where she has also been involved in the junior program as an instructor and as President of the board of directors. In 1957 and again in 1964, Pegel won the Mrs. Charles Francis Adams Trophy, the United States' Women's Sailing Championship. She won the United States' Women's Singlehanded championship, the Allegra Knapp Mertz trophy, in 1974 and was named US Sailor of the Year three times (1964, 1971, 1972). She has also raced, and won championships, in the X Class, C Scow, M Scow and DN Ice boat classes.

Awards 
In 2008, Pegel was elected to the Inland Lake Yachting Association Hall of Fame. Pegel was elected into the United States' National Sailing Hall of Fame in 2021.

Personal life 
Pegel's husband, Bob Pegel, is also a sailor and they raced together in the E Scow class, splitting the skippering duties between the upwind and downwind legs. They ran a shop where they restored vintage ice boats so they were ready to be sailed.

References

External links 
The Saturday Evening Post article with a picture of Pegel in a story about ice boating
 2016 interview with Pegel in ice boating magazine

American female sailors (sport)
Living people
1933 births
University of Wisconsin alumni